tRNA pseudouridine synthase A is an enzyme that in humans is encoded by the PUS1 gene.

PUS1 converts uridine into pseudouridine after the nucleotide has been incorporated into RNA. Pseudouridine may have a functional role in tRNAs and may assist in the peptidyl transfer reaction of rRNAs.[supplied by OMIM]. The mutations in PUS1 gene has been linked to mitochondrial myopathy and sideroblastic anemia.

See also 
Pseudouridine kinase
Mitochondrial tRNA pseudouridine27/28 synthase
TRNA pseudouridine38/39 synthase
TRNA pseudouridine32 synthase

References

Further reading 

 
 
 
 
 
 

EC 5.4.99